The Steinerner Steg is a two-arched, stone-built footbridge across the Passer in Merano, South Tyrol, northern Italy. The oldest bridge in the town, it connects the historic centre and the Steinach district with the Obermais quarter.

In 1615 the wooden aqueduct which spanned the river here had fallen into disrepair and the town decided to demolish it and build a stone bridge in its place. The following year Andrä Tanner, an architect from Brixen, was contracted to build the replacement. Scarcely had the works been completed, however, when the new bridge was washed away in a flood. The current structure was completed in 1617. The bridge is in close proximity to the Passeirer Tor, one of the town gates of Merano.


Naming
“Steinerner Steg” is simply German name for “stone footbridge”, while “Ponte Romano” is the Italian equivalent of “Roman bridge”. Although the latter name has been taken to imply that the bridge might have ancient Roman origins, but in fact “Ponte Romano” was only introduced on December 2, 1927 by the fascist authorities as part of their Italianization of South Tyrol campaign.

Notes

Further reading

External links 

Bridges in Italy
Stone bridges in Italy
Buildings and structures in South Tyrol
Merano
Transport in South Tyrol
Bridges completed in 1617
1617 establishments in the Holy Roman Empire
Stone arch bridges
1617 establishments in Italy